Peter Joseph D'Alonzo (May 26, 1929 – December 27, 2001) was an American football fullback who played two seasons with the Detroit Lions of the National Football League (NFL). He was drafted by the Lions in the fourth round of the 1951 NFL Draft. He played college football at Villanova University and attended Orange High School in Orange, New Jersey.

References

External links
Just Sports Stats

1929 births
2001 deaths
Orange High School (New Jersey) alumni
Players of American football from New Jersey
American football fullbacks
Villanova Wildcats football players
Detroit Lions players
People from Orange, New Jersey
Sportspeople from Essex County, New Jersey